The International Journal of Learning and Media (IJLM) is an electronic peer-reviewed academic journal devoted to examining the relationship between learning and media. The journal is published four times a year by the MIT Press and is online-only.

External links
 

English-language journals
Publications established in 2009
Quarterly journals
MIT Press academic journals
Education journals
Online-only journals